Tribal Warrior is an Aboriginal Australian non-profit organisation based in Redfern, New South Wales.

Activities
Tribal Warrior runs a mentoring program in partnership with Redfern Police to help reduce recidivism rates of Aboriginal Australian youth. The program is named "Clean Slate Without Prejudice" and uses ‘routine and discipline’ through boxing and fitness classes as a way of keeping vulnerable and at risk youth from being involved in criminal activity. In 2016, the program received a gold award in the police category of the Australian Crime and Violence Prevention Awards (ACVPA). The mentoring program initially started for young men, and later developed a women's program as well.

The organisation also runs an Aboriginal Cultural Cruise which allows visitors to Sydney to view the sights of Sydney Harbour and hear stories of the Eora, Cadigal, Guringai, Wangal, Gammeraigal and Wallumedegal people.

Since operating their cultural and corporate cruises, Tribal Warrior began a program providing maritime qualification training for disadvantaged Aboriginal Australians.

The organisation was founded in part to form an all Indigenous team to compete in the Sydney to Hobart race. Following an crowdfunding appeal, on Boxing Day, 2016, Tribal Warrior sailed the Southern Excellence Two in the event. The organisation missing the race's entry deadline due to a lack of funds, and was not part of the official race, but participated nonetheless.

People
In 2013, CEO and Chairman Shane Phillips was awarded the Australian of the Year Local Hero Award recognising his work in the Redfern community. Phillips is a former player and current reserve coach for the Redfern All Blacks.

Mr Phillips is a current panel member of the Indigenous Advisory Committee for Westpac bank, helping to provide advice on Indigenous issues as they relate to the bank's business activities.

Boats
The organisation operates the "Tribal Warrior" - a 15.4-metre gaff-rigged ketch. The sailboat was built more than 100 years ago in the Torres Strait and is used to train Indigenous skippers and maritime workers.

The organisation's vessel "Mari Nawi" (meaning 'big canoe' in the Eora language) is used for cruises and accommodates up to 150 guests with options for on board catering and entertainment.

In 2020 Tribal Warrior was donated the retired Lady-class ferry Lady Northcott by the NSW Government. The vessel underwent works in Newcastle in order to put it back into survey. When the works were complete the vessel returned to Sydney Harbour under her own power on the 26th of September 2022. The vessel is now berthed in Blackwattle Bay where works are being undertaken to convert her to a cruise vessel.

See also
 The Block (Sydney)
 Redfern All Blacks

References

Aboriginal organisations in New South Wales
Organisations based in Sydney